The following is the final results of the 2005–06 Premier Soccer League football season.

Final table

Premier League awards 
 Player of the Season: Surprise Moriri (Mamelodi Sundowns)
 Players' Player of the Season: Surprise Moriri
 Coach of the Season: Owen da Gama (Silver Stars)
 Lesley Manyathela Golden Boot Award: Mame Niang (Moroka Swallows)
 Finest Moment of the Season: Esrom Nyandoro (Mamelodi Sundowns)
 Perfectly Balanced Team of the Season: Moroka Swallows
 Referees of the Season: Andile Ncobo and Abdul Ebrahim
 Assistant Referee of the Season: Toko Malebo
 Photographer of the Season: Lefty Shivambu
 Print Personality of the Season: Vincent Mashego
 Radio Personality of the Season: Connie Matjipa
 Supporters Recognition Award: Bloemfontein Celtic
 Bo Moseneke Award: Robert Marawa and Thomas Mlambo

Top goalscorers 

 Last updated: May 30, 2006
 Source: PSL official website

References

External links 
 RSSSF competition overview

2005-06
2005–06 in African association football leagues
1